Aspidoscelis is a genus of whiptail lizards in the family Teiidae.

Taxonomy
The nomenclature for the genus Aspidoscelis was published by T.W. Reeder et al. in 2002. Many species that were formerly included in the genus Cnemidophorus are now considered Aspidoscelis based upon divergent characters between the two groups.

Etymology

Species
The following species are recognized as being valid.

Aspidoscelis angusticeps  - Yucatán whiptail
Aspidoscelis arizonae  - Arizona striped whiptail
Aspidoscelis burti  - canyon spotted whiptail
Aspidoscelis calidipes  - Tepalcatepec Valley whiptail
Aspidoscelis carmenensis  - Carmen Island whiptail
Aspidoscelis ceralbensis  - Cerralvo Island whiptail
Aspidoscelis communis  - Colima giant whiptail
Aspidoscelis costatus  - Mexico whiptail lizard
Aspidoscelis cozumela  - Cozumel racerunner
Aspidoscelis danheimae  - Isla San José whiptail
Aspidoscelis deppii  - blackbelly racerunner
Aspidoscelis dixoni  - gray checkered whiptail
Aspidoscelis espiritensis  - Espiritu Santo whiptail
Aspidoscelis exsanguis  - Chihuahuan spotted whiptail
Aspidoscelis franciscensis  - San Francisco Island whiptail
Aspidoscelis gularis  - Texas spotted whiptail
Aspidoscelis guttatus  - Mexican racerunner
Aspidoscelis hyperythrus  - orange-throated whiptail
Aspidoscelis inornatus  - little striped whiptail
Aspidoscelis labialis  - Baja California whiptail
Aspidoscelis laredoensis  - Laredo striped whiptail
Aspidoscelis lineattissimus  - many-lined whiptail
Aspidoscelis marmoratus  - marbled whiptail
Aspidoscelis martyris  - San Pedro Martir whiptail
Aspidoscelis maslini  - Maslin's whiptail
Aspidoscelis maximus  - Cape Region whiptail
Aspidoscelis mexicanus  - Mexican whiptail
Aspidoscelis motaguae  - giant whiptail
Aspidoscelis neomexicanus  - New Mexico whiptail
Aspidoscelis neotesselatus  - Colorado checkered whiptail, triploid checkered whiptail
Aspidoscelis opatae  - Opata whiptail
Aspidoscelis pai  - Pai striped whiptail
Aspidoscelis parvisocius  - Mexican pigmy whiptail
Aspidoscelis pictus  - Isla Monserrate whiptail
Aspidoscelis preopatae 
Aspidoscelis rodecki  - Rodeck's whiptail
Aspidoscelis sackii  - Sack's spotted whiptail
Aspidoscelis scalaris  - rusty-rumped whiptail
Aspidoscelis septemvittatus  - plateau spotted whiptail
Aspidoscelis sexlineatus  - six-lined racerunner
Aspidoscelis sonorae  - Sonoran spotted whiptail
Aspidoscelis stictogrammus  - giant spotted whiptail 
Aspidoscelis tesselatus  - common checkered whiptail
Aspidoscelis tigris  - western whiptail
Aspidoscelis uniparens  - desert grassland whiptail lizard
Aspidoscelis velox  - plateau striped whiptail
Aspidoscelis xanthonotus  - red-backed whiptail

Nota bene: A binomial authority in parentheses indicates that the species was originally described in a genus other than Aspidoscelis.

Speciation
In 2011, it was announced that a parthenogenetic hybrid Aspidocelis was bred in the laboratory. This serves as a demonstration of how other hybrid parthenogens in this genus may have arisen.

References

Further reading
Fitzinger L (1843). Systema Reptilium, Fasciculus Primus, Amblyglossae. Vienna: Braumüller & Seidel. 106 pp. + indices. (Aspidoscelis, new genus, p. 20). (in Latin).

External links
Reeder, Tod W.; Dessauer, Herbert C.; Cole, Charles J. (2002). "Phylogenetic relationships of whiptail lizards of the genus Cnemidophorus (Squamata, Teiidae) : a test of monophyly, reevaluation of karyotypic evolution, and review of hybrid origins". American Museum Novitates (3365): 1-61. 

 
Lizard genera
Taxa named by Leopold Fitzinger